The IEEE Photonics Award is a Technical Field Award established by the IEEE Board of Directors in 2002. This award is presented for outstanding achievements in photonics, including work relating to: light-generation, transmission, deflection, amplification and detection and the optical/electro-optical componentry and instrumentation used to accomplish these functions. Also included are storage technologies utilizing photonics to read or write data and optical display technologies. It also extends from energy generation/propagation, communications, information processing, storage and display, biomedical and medical uses of light and measurement applications.

This award may be presented to an individual or a team of up to three people. Recipients of this award receive a bronze medal, certificate, and honorarium.

Recipients 
 2021: Jack Jewell
 2020: Christopher Richard Doerr
 2019: Michal Lipson
 2018: Ursula Keller
 2017: John E. Bowers
 2016: Mark E. Thompson
 2015: Philip St. John Russell
 2014: James G. Fujimoto
 2013: Peter F. Moulton
 2012: Eli Yablonovitch
 2011: Amnon Yariv
 2010: Ivan P. Kaminow
 2009: Robert L. Byer
 2008: Joe C. Campbell
 2007: David N. Payne
 2006: Frederick J. Leonberger 
 2005: Rod C. Alferness
 2004: Tingye Li

References

External links 
 IEEE Photonics Award page at IEEE
 List of recipients of the IEEE Photonics Award

Photonics Award